Hannibal High School is a public high school located in Hannibal, Missouri. HHS serves grades 9 through 12 and is the only high school in Hannibal School District #60.

History 
The first public high school in Hannibal was established in 1866. A new building was constructed in 1934; a number of wood doors to classrooms were replaced in late 2018. HVAC units were added in mid 2019.

Athletics 
HHS athletic teams are nicknamed the Pirates and compete in the North Central Missouri Conference. The school has won two state championships, taking the 1930 Class B boys track and field title as well as the 1990 Class 3A/4A softball championship. In 2008, HHS acquired turf field material from the St. Louis Rams.

Performing arts 
Hannibal has a competitive show choir, "River City Revue".

Notable alumni 
Warren H. Orr, judge on the Supreme Court of Illinois
Lindell Shumake, legislator
Larry Thompson, lawyer
Louis Riggs, Missouri House of Representatives

References

External links

Public high schools in Missouri
Education in Marion County, Missouri
1866 establishments in Missouri
Educational institutions established in 1866
Buildings and structures in Hannibal, Missouri